Shaun Xavier Bridgmohan (born June 24, 1979 in Spanish Town, Jamaica) is a jockey in American Thoroughbred horse racing.

At age thirteen, Bridgmohan's family emigrated to the United States, settling in South Florida where he developed an interest in horse racing. Before becoming a jockey, and while still in school, he worked at a Florida racetrack as a hot walker, groom, and as an exercise rider.  After graduating from high school he pursued a riding career and in August 1997 earned his first win at Calder Race Course. Six months later on February 15, 1998, he won six races on a single card at Aqueduct Racetrack in Queens, New York, finishing 1998, which was his breakout year, as the winner of the Eclipse Award for Outstanding Apprentice Jockey. On December 22, 2007 he again won six races on a single card, this time at Fair Grounds Race Course in New Orleans, Louisiana.
On April 1, 2017 he recorded his 3,000th win.

Horses ridden by Shaun Bridgmohan
Gaff in the $100,000 Mr. Prospector Handicap at Gulfstream Park.
On Thin Ice in the $100,000 Hal's Hope Handicap 
Doctor Decherd in the $125,000 Aventura Stakes

References to Shaun Bridgmohan in popular culture

Bridgmohan was mentioned in the rap song "Fake Patois" by Das Racist, with the line "What you know about Shaun Bridgmohan?/What you know about Shaun Bridgmohan?/First Jamaican in the Kentucky Derby./First Jamaican in the Kentucky Derby."
Bridgmohan was also referenced in the song "Shorty Said" by Das Racist, with the group saying that "Shorty said I look like Shaun Bridgmohan."

Year-end charts

References

External links
 Shaun Bridgmohan bio at Gulfstream Park Racetrack
 Shaun Bridgmohan at the NTRA

1979 births
Jamaican people of Indian descent
Jamaican emigrants to the United States
American jockeys
Eclipse Award winners
Jamaican jockeys
People from Spanish Town
Living people